
This is a list of the 38 players who earned their 2003 PGA Tour card through Q School in 2002.

Players in yellow were 2003 PGA Tour rookies.

2003 Results

*PGA Tour rookie in 2003
T = Tied 
Green background indicates the player retained his PGA Tour card for 2004 (finished inside the top 125). 
Yellow background indicates the player did not retain his PGA Tour card for 2004, but retained conditional status (finished between 126-150). 
Red background indicates the player did not retain his PGA Tour card for 2004 (finished outside the top 150).

Winners on the PGA Tour in 2003

Runners-up on the PGA Tour in 2003

See also
2002 Buy.com Tour graduates

References
Player profiles
Money list

PGA Tour Qualifying School
PGA Tour Qualifying School Graduates
PGA Tour Qualifying School Graduates